The 1943 Battle of Voronezh or Voronezh–Kastornoye offensive operation (often credited in Russian as the liberation of Voronezh (освобождение Воронежа)) was a Soviet counter-offensive on the Eastern Front of World War II on recapturing the city of Voronezh during January 1943.

It took place between 24 January and 17 February 1943, as 4th phase of the general Soviet winter offensive of 1942–1943, immediately following the Ostrogozhsk–Rossosh offensive.

The Axis had captured Voronezh in a 1942 battle, and the 2nd German Army occupied this important bridgehead over the Don, together with Hungarian troops that had escaped the destruction of the Hungarian 2nd Army during the Ostrogozhsk–Rossosh offensive.

The Red Army executed a new pincer movement in difficult winter conditions. From the south, the troops of the   Voronezh Front under command of General Golikov attacked, in collaboration with the left flank of the  Bryansk Front under General Max Reyter, which attacked from the north.

The Germans, attacked on both flanks, were forced into a retreat in the middle of the Russian winter. Their losses were considerable and the 2nd German Army only narrowly escaped destruction, leaving a big gap in the Axis frontline. It opened for the Soviets the way to Kursk, which would be liberated during Operation Star, and also threatened the important bastion of Orel.

References

Citations

Bibliography 

 

1943 in the Soviet Union
Battles involving the Soviet Union
Battles of World War II involving Germany
Battles of World War II involving Hungary
Battles and operations of the Soviet–German War
January 1943 events
February 1943 events